Cyril Mossford (1903-1968) was a male Welsh international table tennis player.

He won a bronze medal at the 1926 World Table Tennis Championships in the men's doubles with Hedley Penny.

See also
 List of table tennis players
 List of World Table Tennis Championships medalists

References

Welsh male table tennis players
1903 births
1968 deaths
World Table Tennis Championships medalists
People from Newtown, Powys
Sportspeople from Powys